is the first compilation album by Japanese rock band Asian Kung-Fu Generation, released on October 25, 2006. The album is primarily composed of B-side tracks from previously released studio singles and recordings of live performances, with the exception of two new non-album tracks, "Kaiga Kyōshitsu" and "Dōdōmeguri no Yoru." It was released with a limited edition two-disc DVD version which included additional live footage.

Track listing

DVD
 "Haruka Kanata" (2003 @ Shibuya Club Quattro) (遥か彼方 (2003 渋谷クラブクアトロ))
 "Mirai no Kakera"(2003 @ Shinjuku Liquidroom)(未来の破片 (2003 新宿リキッドルーム))
 "Kimi to Iu Hana" (2004 @ Government Managed Seaside Park)(君という花 (2004 国営ひたち海浜公園))
 "Rewrite" (2005 @ SHIBUYA-AX) (リライト)
 "Loop & Loop" (2005 @ Yokohama Arena) (ループ&ループ (2005 横浜アリーナ))

Personnel

Masafumi Gotō – lead vocals, guitar
Kensuke Kita – lead guitar, background vocals
Takahiro Yamada –  bass, background vocals
Kiyoshi Ijichi – drums
Asian Kung-Fu Generation – producer

Tohru Takayama – mixing
Mitsuharu Harada – mastering
Kenichi Nakamura – recording
Yusuke Nakamura – art direction

Chart positions

References

External links
 CDJapan
 Feedback File at MusicBrainz

Asian Kung-Fu Generation albums

2006 compilation albums
Japanese-language compilation albums
Sony Music compilation albums